North Gyeongsang Province is a province in eastern South Korea. The province was formed in 1896 from the northern half of the former Gyeongsang province, and remained a province of Korea(as Keishōhoku-dō during Japanese rule) until the country's division in 1945, then became part of South Korea.

Daegu was the capital of North Gyeongsang Province between 1896 and 1981, but has not been a part of the province since 1981. In 2016, the provincial capital moved from Daegu to Andong.

Geography and climate
The province is part of the Yeongnam region, bordered on the south by Gyeongsangnam-do, on the west by Jeollabuk-do and Chungcheongbuk-do Provinces, and on the north by Gangwon-do Province. It is largely surrounded by mountains: the Taebaek Mountains in the east and the Sobaek Mountains in the west.

Culture
North Gyeongsang Province is the homeland of the former kingdom of Silla and has retained much of its cultural tradition. A number of artists, political leaders and scholars have come from the province.

Demographics

Religion

According to the census of 2015, 25.3% followed Buddhism and 18.5% followed Christianity (13.3% Protestantism and 5.2% Catholicism). 55.4% of the population is irreligious.

Administrative divisions
Gyeongsangbuk-do is divided into 10 cities (si) and 13 counties (gun). The names below are given in English, hangul, and hanja. Gyeongsang do is originated from Gyeongju & Sangju old city of Gyeong+Sang from Joseon kinģdom(1392-1910). Do means road to 8 directional road from Seoul. Pohang is Korean steel production hub, Gumi is electronics capital of South Korea.

Recent discoveries
In September 2021, archaeologists announced the discovery of 1500 years-old woman skeleton with a necklace and a bracelet in North Gyeongsang Province. The remains of a 135-centimeter-tall woman, who is estimated to have died in her 20s, were discovered along with the bones of animals such as horses and cows, as well as earthenware.

See also
Liancourt Rocks
People Power Party (South Korea)

References

External links
  
 Alsace/Gyeongsangbuk-do

 
Provinces of South Korea
States and territories established in 1896